Mohsen Amooaghaei is a paralympic athlete from Iran competing mainly in category F33-34 shot put events.

He competed in the 2004 Summer Paralympics winning a bronze medal in the F33-34 shot put.

References

Paralympic athletes of Iran
Athletes (track and field) at the 2004 Summer Paralympics
Paralympic bronze medalists for Iran
Living people
Medalists at the 2004 Summer Paralympics
Year of birth missing (living people)
Paralympic medalists in athletics (track and field)
Iranian male shot putters